Leposoma puk is a species of lizard in the family Gymnophthalmidae. It is endemic to Brazil.

References

Leposoma
Reptiles of Brazil
Endemic fauna of Brazil
Reptiles described in 2002
Taxa named by Miguel Trefaut Rodrigues
Taxa named by Marianna Dixo
Taxa named by Dante Pavan
Taxa named by Vanessa Kruth Verdade